The Austin Museum of Digital Art (AMODA) is located in Austin, Texas. It is the first museum dedicated exclusively to the display of digital art. AMODA was founded in 1997 by Harold Chaput, Samantha Krukowski and Chris Rankin in response to the abundance of digital art in the local scene and the absence of venues for digital art. AMODA has not only presented local artwork, but also has brought digital art and digital artists from around the globe to Austin. By collecting and placing local and global works next to each other, AMODA has contributed to the already growing digital art and music scene in Austin. Gaining recognition around the world as an important museum has helped shape the definition of digital art.

History
The Austin Museum of Digital Art is the brainchild of Harold Chaput, then a Computer Sciences doctoral student at the University of Texas at Austin, and Christopher Rankin, an art history graduate of Trinity University and experienced museum worker. Rankin was dissatisfied with the state of the contemporary art scene in Austin. Chaput was connected to many artists and musicians employed in high tech positions who were looking for a creative outlet. By establishing an organization with the goals of supporting the production and exhibition of new work and encouraging discussion about the role of technology in current contemporary art, Chaput and Rankin hoped that they could encourage a community of artists, musicians, and technologists to create cutting-edge digital-based contemporary art.

They joined up with Samantha Krukowski, an influential member of UT's communications department. The three of them swiftly settled on a subsection of contemporary art that used computers in some form, and coined the term Digital Art to describe it. They also agreed that the new organization should be a museum rather than a collective or a gallery, placing the emphasis on artistry and aesthetics rather than fashion and popularity. Thus the Austin Museum of Digital Art was founded in November 1997.

Shortly after its founding, Rankin left AMODA because his new job working for the Texas Commission on the Arts posed a conflict of interest. Krukowski also left to become a Professor of Communications at UT. Rankin and Krukowski were replaced Kyle Anderson, Jennifer Potter, Joel Stearns and Robert Turknett. Together with Chaput, this board moved AMODA from a museum on paper, to an art institution. They created AMODA's programs, including an educational program (2000), the Digital Showcase (2001), an exhibition series (2002), and a performance series (2003).

Defining Digital Art
AMODA defines Digital Art as art that uses digital technology in one of three ways: product, process or subject.

Art that uses digital technology as the product can be considered digital art. This includes categories like "web art" or "demo art." This is the most recognized definition of digital art.

Art that uses digital technology in the process of creation can also be considered digital art. The drawings of Harold Cohen's AARON are digital art because a computer program was used to generate the works, even though the final product is ink on paper. Computer graphics on film, digital music, and the Cyberopera are all good examples of digital art as process.

Finally, art that references digital art as its subject can also be considered digital art. A series of oil paintings showing a man connected to an online chat room could be categorized as digital art, even though digital technology was never used in the creation or display of the work.

The central theme for all three approaches is: art that could not have been created without digital technology. All three address different facets of digital art, from presentation to technique to sociology, all of which are important to the history of art.

Programming
AMODA's programming was designed to be accessible without being condescending. It was unique in its ability to draw a younger audience than other museums and galleries could. AMODA's programs were integrated with the community and attracted a new population of art patrons through its non-traditional but high-quality presentation of digital art.

AMODA's most popular and successful programs were its Exhibition Series and Digital Showcase.

Digital Showcase
The AMODA Digital Showcase is a monthly evening of digital art and music. Under the strict direction of Todd Simmons, a performance space is filled with digital art installations, and four to six digital music performances are shown throughout the evening.

The intention of the Digital Showcase is to show digital art in situ. While an exhibition removes art from its natural environment and displays it for isolated examination, the Digital Showcase lets the different art installations and music performances bleed over each other. The result is an immersive art experience where the whole is greater than the sum of its parts. It is also wildly popular. Attendance is consistently in the hundreds, and the performances have been written up internationally.

External links and references
Digital paintings

Art museums and galleries in Texas
Museums in Austin, Texas
Contemporary art galleries in the United States
Digital art
Art museums established in 1997
1997 establishments in Texas
Museums of digital art